Fatima El Kettani is a Lebanese psychiatrist and writer who has published a number of books in the field of mental health, including His Great moral with Children - An Analytical Study of Childhood in the Life of the Prophet Muhammad.

Books 
I Befriend Myself is about self-development and psychological treatment of problems.

Escape from Freedom is about the causes of suffering, and Wake up to see the light that is inside yourself, a 2015 book about the human being as a soul, a body, and a self that is composed of two selves.

Release the Giant from the Inside of Your Child is about the early stages of human life and the role of parents in the development of the child.

How to Win Your Teenage Son - Learn How to Overcome with Your Children the Difficulties of the Adolescence Stage! answers parents' questions.

Psychological Toxins (2021) is about negative thoughts and feelings.

References 

Beirut
Year of birth missing (living people)
Living people